Mew(s) may refer to:

People 
Mew (surname)
Mew Azama (born 1986), Japanese model and actress
Suppasit Jongcheveevat (born 1991), Thai actor nicknamed 'Mew'

Characters
Mew (Pokémon), a mythical Pokémon from Kanto
Mew, a fictional seagull in "Roverandom"
Mew, a character in the Thai movie Love of Siam
Mew, the main female character in the webtoon "Nice to meet you" by "Wishroomness".

Other uses 
Mew (cat vocalization), a soft crying sound
Mew, a rare synonym for seagull
Mew (band), from Denmark
Mew (software), a female vocal for Vocaloid 3
Manufacturer's Empty Weight, the weight of the aircraft "as built"
Mortgage equity withdrawal, the decision of consumers to borrow money against the real value of their houses
Measure of Economic Welfare
Mew Island, one of the Copeland Islands
Microwave Early Warning - radar developed by the United States during WWII

MEWS
mews or MEWS may refer to:
Mews, a type of housing in Britain
Mews (falconry), a birdhouse designed to house one or more birds of prey
Mews (restaurant), in Baltimore, Ireland
Modified early warning score, a tool for evaluating deteriorating patients in medicine

See also
Mu (disambiguation)
Moo (disambiguation)
Myu (disambiguation)
Muse (disambiguation)